MachEye is an American technology company that produces software using natural search and AI-powered analytics. Its software presents data insights as interactive audio-visuals.

The company is based in San Jose, California.

History 
MachEye was founded in 2018 by Ramesh Panuganty. Panuganty previously founded Drastin, the conversational analytics platform that was later acquired by Splunk to improve search-based analytics and intuity in Splunk.

In 2020, they launched an AI-powered platform. In October 2020, they raised $4.6 million in seed funding, backed by Canaan Partners and West Wave Capital.

Services 
MachEye's platform uses technologies such as artificial intelligence, machine learning, natural language processing, natural language generation, and text-to-speech. MachEye's AI technology generates audio-visual reports based on users' data. MachEye can also generate reports based on an analysis of users' search history on its platform.

MachEye's platform can connect to cloud data sources such as Amazon Redshift, Microsoft's Synapse, Google's BigQuery, and Snowflake Computing's CDP.

References

Companies based in San Jose, California
Software companies based in California